Phryganodes selenalis is a moth in the family Crambidae. It was described by Aristide Caradja in 1933. It is found in Guangdong, China.

References

Spilomelinae
Moths described in 1899